Robert Emmett Harron (April 12, 1893 – September 5, 1920) was an American motion picture actor of the early silent film era. Although he acted in over 200 films, he is possibly best recalled for his roles in the D.W. Griffith directed films The Birth of a Nation (1915) and Intolerance (1916).

Early life and family
Born in New York City, Harron was second oldest child of nine siblings in a poor, working-class Irish Catholic family. Harron's younger siblings John (nicknamed "Johnnie"), Mary, and Charles also became actors while one of his younger sisters, Tessie, was an extra in silent films. Charles was killed in a car accident in December 1915. Tessie died of Spanish influenza in 1918 while Harron's brother John died of spinal meningitis in 1939.

Harron attended the Saint John Parochial School in Greenwich Village. At the age of fourteen, he found work as an errand boy at American Biograph Studios near Union Square in Manhattan to help support his family. In addition to cleaning duties, Harron also appeared as an extra in a few shorts for Biograph.

Career
Within a year of working for Biograph, Harron was noticed by newly hired director D.W. Griffith.  Harron quickly became a favorite of Griffith and Griffith began to give the 14-year-old increasingly larger film roles. His first film for Griffith was the 1909 short crime drama The Lonely Villa. The teenaged Harron was often cast by Griffith in the role of the "sensitive" and "naïve" boy, who was overwhelmingly sympathetic and appealing to American film-goers in the very early years of American motion pictures and not far removed from Harron's real-life persona; Harron was often described as a quiet and soft-spoken youth. It was these traits that helped garner much public interest in the young actor, especially amongst young female fans. In 1912 alone, Harron appeared in nearly forty films at Biograph.

Harron is probably best recalled for his roles in the three epic Griffith films: 1914's Judith of Bethulia, opposite Blanche Sweet, Mae Marsh, Henry B. Walthall, and Dorothy and Lillian Gish; 1915's controversial all-star cast The Birth of a Nation; and 1916's colossal multi-scenario Intolerance opposite such popular stars of the era as Lillian Gish, Mae Marsh, Miriam Cooper, Wallace Reid, Harold Lockwood, and Mildred Harris.  One of Harron's most popular roles of the era came in 1919 when he starred opposite Lillian Gish in the Griffith directed romantic film True Heart Susie.

Robert Harron's film career continued to flourish throughout the 1910s and he was occasionally paired with leading actresses Mae Marsh and Lillian Gish with romantic plots, often in roles that cemented his "sensitive boy" image. Harron had, in fact, a burgeoning off-screen romantic relationship with Dorothy Gish. By 1920, Harron had grown too old to continue playing the juvenile roles that had launched his career. He began losing leading man roles to Richard Barthelmess. Later that year, D.W. Griffith agreed to loan Harron to Metro Pictures for a four-picture deal. His first film for Metro, also the last film of his career, was the comedy  Coincidence. The film was released in 1921, after Harron's death.

Death
In late August 1920, Harron traveled by train from Los Angeles to New York City to attend the premiere of the film Way Down East and a preview of what would become his final film, Coincidence. Harron checked into the Hotel Seymour on September 1 with his friend, screenwriter and director Victor Heerman, with whom he was sharing a room. Harron and Heerman attended the preview for Coincidence later that day. Heerman later said that the preview went poorly as the film was not well received by the audience.

After the premiere, Harron returned to his hotel room alone. At some point during the evening, Harron sustained a gunshot wound to the chest. According to published reports and Harron's own account, he had the gun in his trunk along with his clothes and other possessions. As he was removing clothes from the trunk, the gun fell to the floor and discharged. Harron was hit in the chest, the bullet having punctured his lung.
 Harron called the hotel desk for assistance and was still conscious when the hotel manager came to his room. Not realizing he was seriously wounded, Harron joked with the manager that he was in a "devil of a fix" having shot himself. He initially refused to let the manager call an ambulance, only wanting to be examined by a local physician in his room. After a physician could not be found, Harron relented and agreed to allow the manager to call an ambulance. When medics arrived and attempted to transport Harron using a stretcher, he insisted on being taken down in a chair. As he had lost a considerable amount of blood, medics had to convince Harron that he needed to be transported on a stretcher.

Harron was taken to Bellevue Hospital Center where he remained conscious but in critical condition. While he was being treated, Harron was arrested for possessing a firearm without a permit under the Sullivan Act and placed in the hospital's prison ward. Shortly after the shooting, rumors arose that the shooting was not accidental and Harron had attempted suicide. There was speculation that Harron was disappointed over being passed over for the leading role in Way Down East (Richard Barthelmess was ultimately cast). Several of Harron's friends rejected the attempted suicide theory. Victor Heerman, with whom he often went on double dates and was staying with Harron in the Hotel Seymour, later said that he visited Harron in the hospital and he denied that he had attempted suicide. Harron admitted the gun belonged to him, but claimed that he had brought it with him because he did not want the gun at the family home in Los Angeles. Harron told Heerman that his younger brother Johnnie had become "hard to handle" and he feared leaving the gun at the family home where Johnnie could find it. Harron told Heerman that he wrapped the gun up in a pair of his trousers and placed them in his suitcase. On the night of the shooting, Harron said he had gone to retrieve the trousers from his suitcase to have them pressed when the gun fell out onto the floor and discharged. Harron also told a priest who visited him in the hospital that the shooting was an accident.

Despite Harron's denial, rumors of attempted suicide persisted. One such rumor was that Harron attempted suicide over the breakup of his relationship with Dorothy Gish. Victor Heerman rejected this theory because Harron, a teetotaler and virgin, was a devout Catholic who would have deemed suicide a mortal sin. Actresses Miriam Cooper and Lillian Gish, both of whom were friends with Harron, agreed with Heerman's reasoning. Cooper and Gish also believed Harron would not have attempted suicide as he was his family's major source of income and had plans to start shooting a new film with Elmer Clifton.

Friends who visited Harron in the hospital were optimistic about his recovery as he appeared to be on the mend. However, on September 5, four days after he was shot, Harron died of his wound. He is interred at Calvary Cemetery in Woodside, Queens, New York City.

Filmography

References

Bibliography 
John Holmstrom, The Moving Picture Boy: An International Encyclopaedia from 1895 to 1995, Norwich, Michael Russell, 1996, p. 10.

External links

 Robert Harron at Silents Are Golden
 

1893 births
1920 deaths
20th-century American male actors
Male actors from New York City
American male child actors
American male film actors
American people of Irish descent
American male silent film actors
Burials at Calvary Cemetery (Queens)
Deaths by firearm in Manhattan
Firearm accident victims in the United States
Catholics from New York (state)
Accidental deaths in New York (state)